Idiotropiscis is a genus of pygmy pipehorse endemic to Australia. They are commonly called pygmy pipehorses due to their small size.

Species
There are currently three recognized species in this genus:
 Idiotropiscis australe (Waite & Hale, 1921) (Southern little pipehorse)
 Idiotropiscis larsonae (C. E. Dawson, 1984) (Helen's pygmy pipehorse)
 Idiotropiscis lumnitzeri Kuiter, 2004 (Sydney's pygmy pipehorse)

References

 
Taxa named by Gilbert Percy Whitley
Marine fish genera
Taxonomy articles created by Polbot